Daniel Dorin Stan (born 28 August 1978) is a Romanian former football striker who played in his career for teams such as Bihor Oradea, Oțelul Galați, Internaţional and Gloria Bistriţa.

External links 
 

1978 births
Living people
Romanian footballers
Association football forwards
Liga I players
Liga II players
FC Internațional Curtea de Argeș players
FC Bihor Oradea players
ASC Oțelul Galați players
FC Unirea Urziceni players
FC Petrolul Ploiești players
CS Mioveni players
ACF Gloria Bistrița players